Bed and Breakfast is a 1938 British drama film directed by Walter West and starring Daphne Courtney, Barry Lupino and Frank Miller. It depicts the lives of the inhabitants in a boarding house. It was the last appearance of the silent star Mabel Poulton in a feature film as well as the last to be directed by West. The film was made at Southall Studios, with production beginning in May 1936.

Cast
 Daphne Courtney - Margaret Reynolds 
 Barry Lupino - Bert Fink 
 Frank Miller - Charles Blake 
 Mabel Poulton - The Maid

Bibliography
 Chibnall, Steve. Quota Quickies: The British of the British 'B' Film. British Film Institute, 2007.
 Low, Rachael. Filmmaking in 1930s Britain. George Allen & Unwin, 1985.
 Wood, Linda. British Films, 1927-1939. British Film Institute, 1986.

References

External links

1938 films
1938 drama films
British drama films
Films directed by Walter West
Films shot at Southall Studios
British black-and-white films
1930s English-language films
1930s British films